Walter Duff (22 April 1876 – 11 November 1921) was an Australian cricketer. He played three first-class matches for New South Wales in 1902/03.

See also
 List of New South Wales representative cricketers

References

External links
 

1876 births
1921 deaths
Australian cricketers
New South Wales cricketers
Cricketers from Sydney